Ashraf Iskandar oglu Huseynov (September 20, 1907, Amirvarli, Jabrayil District — August 26, 1981, Baku) was an Azerbaijani mathematician (Professor from 1948, member of Azerbaijan National Academy of Sciences from 1962). His area of contributions embraced nonlinear singular integral equations, differential equations, potential theory and functional analysis.

Huseynov was first to study the nonlinear Hilbert problem as applied to analytic functions. He also created the Hα, β, γ function space and proved some theorems for nonlinear singular integral equations with Cauchy kernel within that space. Huseynov held positions in some Azerbaijani scientific institutions.

References

1907 births
1981 deaths
Soviet mathematicians
Recipients of the Order of the Red Banner of Labour
20th-century Azerbaijani mathematicians
Burials at II Alley of Honor